The Fokker D.VII was a German World War I fighter aircraft designed by Reinhold Platz of the Fokker-Flugzeugwerke. Germany produced around 3,300 D.VII aircraft in the second half of 1918. In service with the Luftstreitkräfte, the D.VII quickly proved itself to be a formidable aircraft. The Armistice ending the war specifically required, as the fourth clause of the "Clauses Relating to the Western Front", that Germany was required to surrender all D.VIIs to the Allies. Surviving aircraft saw much service with many countries in the years after World War I.

Development and production

Fokker's chief designer, Reinhold Platz, had been working on a series of experimental V-series aircraft, starting in 1916. The aircraft were notable for the use of cantilever wings. Hugo Junkers and his aviation firm had originated the idea in 1915 with the first practical all-metal aircraft, the Junkers J 1 monoplane, nicknamed Blechesel (Sheet Metal Donkey or Tin Donkey). The wings were thick, with a rounded leading edge. The shape of the wings' airfoil gave greater lift, with its relatively "blunt" leading edge (as seen in cross-section) giving it more docile stalling behavior than the thin wings commonly in use.

Late in 1917, Fokker built the experimental V 11 biplane, fitted with the standard Mercedes D.IIIa engine. In January 1918, Idflieg held a fighter competition at Adlershof. For the first time, front line pilots participated in the evaluation and selection of new fighters. Fokker submitted the V 11 along with several other prototypes. Manfred von Richthofen flew the V 11 and found it tricky, unpleasant and directionally unstable in a dive. Platz lengthened the rear fuselage by one structural bay and added a triangular fin in front of the rudder. Richthofen tested the modified V 11 and praised it as the best aircraft of the competition. It offered excellent performance from the outdated Mercedes engine, yet was safe and easy to fly. Richthofen's recommendation virtually decided the competition, but he was not alone in recommending it. Fokker immediately received a provisional order for 400 production aircraft, which were named D.VII by Idflieg.

Fokker's factory was not up to the task of meeting all D.VII production orders and Idflieg directed Albatros and AEG to build the D.VII under license, though AEG did not ultimately produce any aircraft. Because the Fokker factory did not use detailed plans as part of its production process, Fokker simply sent a D.VII airframe for Albatros to copy. Albatros paid Fokker a five percent royalty for every D.VII it  built under license. Albatros Flugzeugwerke and its subsidiary, Ostdeutsche Albatros Werke (OAW), built the D.VII at factories in Johannisthal [Fokker D.VII (Alb)] and Schneidemühl [Fokker D.VII (OAW)] respectively. Aircraft markings included the type designation and factory suffix, immediately before the individual serial number.

Some parts were not interchangeable between aircraft produced at different factories, even between Albatros and OAW. Each manufacturer tended to differ in both nose paint styles and the patterning and layout of their engine compartment cooling louvers on the sides of the nose. OAW produced examples were delivered with distinctive mauve and green splotches on the cowling. All D.VIIs were produced with either the five-color Fünffarbiger or less often, the four-color Vierfarbiger lozenge camouflage covering, except for early Fokker-produced D.VIIs, which had a streaked green fuselage. Factory camouflage finishes were often overpainted with colorful paint schemes or insignia for the Jasta or for a pilot.

In September 1918, eight D.VIIs were delivered to Bulgaria. Late in 1918, the Austro-Hungarian company Magyar Általános Gépgyár (MÁG, Hungarian General Machine Company) commenced licensed production of the D.VII with Austro-Daimler engines. Production continued after the end of the war, with as many as 50 aircraft completed.

Powerplants
The earliest production D.VIIs were equipped with 170–180 hp Mercedes D.IIIa. Production quickly switched to the intended standard engine, the higher-compression 134 kW (180–200 hp) Mercedes D.IIIaü. Some early production D.VIIs delivered with the Mercedes D.IIIa were later re-engined with the D.IIIaü.

By mid-1918, some D.VIIs received the "overcompressed" 138 kW (185 hp) BMW IIIa, the first product of the BMW firm. The BMW IIIa followed the SOHC, straight-six configuration of the Mercedes D.III but incorporated several improvements. Increased displacement, higher compression and an altitude-adjusting carburettor produced a marked increase in speed and climb rate at high altitude. Because the BMW IIIa was overcompressed, using full throttle at altitudes below  risked premature detonation in the cylinders and damage to the engine. At low altitudes, full throttle could produce up to 179 kW (240 hp) for a short time. Fokker-built aircraft with the new BMW engine were called D.VII(F), the suffix "F" standing for Max Friz, the engine designer.

BMW-engined aircraft entered service with Jasta 11 in late June 1918. Pilots clamored for the D.VII(F), of which about 750 were built. Production of the BMW IIIa was limited and the D.VII continued to be produced with the 134 kW (180 hp) Mercedes D.IIIaü until the end of the war.

D.VIIs flew with different propeller designs from different manufacturers. Despite the variations there is no indication these propellers gave disparate performance. Axial, Wolff, Wotan, and Heine propellers have been noted.

Operational history

World War I

The D.VII entered squadron service with Jasta 10 in early May 1918. When the Fokker D.VII appeared on the Western Front in April 1918, Allied pilots at first underestimated the new fighter because of its squarish, ungainly appearance but quickly revised their view. The type quickly proved to have many important advantages over the Albatros and Pfalz scouts. Unlike the Albatros scouts, the D.VII could dive without any fear of structural failure. The D.VII was also noted for its high manoeuvrability and ability to climb, its remarkably docile stall and reluctance to spin. It could "hang on its prop" without stalling for brief periods of time, spraying enemy aircraft from below with machine gun fire. These handling characteristics contrasted with contemporary scouts such as the Camel and SPAD, which stalled sharply and spun vigorously.

Several aircraft suffered rib failures and fabric shedding on the upper wing. Heat from the engine sometimes ignited phosphorus ammunition until additional cooling louvers were installed on the metal sides of the engine cowling panels and fuel tanks sometimes broke at the seams. Aircraft built by the Fokker factory at Schwerin were noted for their lower standard of workmanship and materials. Despite faults, the D.VII proved to be a remarkably successful design, leading to the familiar aphorism that it could turn a mediocre pilot into a good one and a good pilot into an ace.

Richthofen died days before the D.VII began to reach the Jagdstaffeln and never flew it in combat. Other pilots, including Erich Löwenhardt and Hermann Göring, quickly racked up victories and generally lauded the design. Aircraft availability was limited at first, but by July there were 407 in service. Larger numbers became available by August, by which point D.VIIs had achieved 565 victories. The D.VII eventually equipped 46 Jagdstaffeln. When the war ended in November, 775 D.VII aircraft were in service.

Post-war service

The Allies confiscated large numbers of D.VII aircraft after the Armistice. The United States Army and Navy evaluated 142 captured examples. Several of these aircraft were re-engined with American-built Liberty L-6 motors, very similar in appearance to the D.VII's original German power plants. France, Great Britain and Canada also received numbers of war prizes.

Other countries used the D.VII operationally. The Polish deployed approximately 50 aircraft during the Polish-Soviet War, using them mainly for ground attack missions. The Hungarian Soviet Republic used a number of D.VIIs, both built by MAG and ex-German aircraft in the Hungarian-Romanian War of 1919.

The Dutch, Swiss, and Belgian air forces also operated the D.VII. The aircraft proved so popular that Anthony Fokker completed and sold a large number of D.VII airframes that he had smuggled into the Netherlands by rail after the Armistice. As late as 1929, the Alfred Comte company manufactured eight new D.VII airframes under license for the Swiss Fliegertruppe.

Variants
Fokker V 11  Prototype
Fokker V 21 Prototype with tapered wings
Fokker V 22 Prototype with four-bladed propeller
Fokker V 24 Prototype with  Benz Bz.IVü engine
Fokker V 31  One D.VII aircraft fitted with a hook to tow the Fokker V 30 glider
Fokker V 34  D.VII development with  BMW IIIa engine
Fokker V 35  Two-seat development with  BMW IIIa engine and undercarriage fuel tank
Fokker V 36  D.VII development with  BMW IIIa engine and undercarriage fuel tank
Fokker V 38  Prototype Fokker C.I
D.VII Production aircraft from Fokker; either from their wartime Schwerin/Görries headquarters, or post-Armistice, in the Netherlands.
D.VII(Alb) Production aircraft from Albatros Flugzeugwerke in Johannisthal, Berlin
D.VII(MAG) Production by Magyar Altalános Gepgyár RT - (MAG) at Mátyásföld, near Budapest
D.VII(OAW) Production aircraft from Ostdeutsche Albatros Werke in Schneidemühl.
MAG-Fokker 90.05 The Fokker V 22 powered by a  Austro-Daimler 200hp 6-cyl.
Fokker D.VII Lithuanian versions1 D.VII powered by Siddeley Puma, produced in 1928; 2 D.VII, powered by Mercedes D.III, produced in 1930. Both types featured larger engine cowling and radiator under the nose.

Operators

 : Argentine Naval Aviation (one ex-French captured aircraft postwar)
 : Austro-Hungarian Navy
 
 Belgian Air Force
 9 Squadron  (postwar)
 : Bulgarian Air Force
 : (postwar)
 : Royal Danish Air Force (postwar) - operated a single D.VII from 1922 to 1927.
 : Finnish Air Force (postwar)
 : Police air squadron (postwar)
 
 Luftstreitkräfte
 Kaiserliche Marine
 : Royal Hungarian Air Force (postwar)
 :  (postwar)
 Army Aviation Group (LVA)
 Naval Aviation Service (MLD)
 Netherlands Indies: LA-KNIL
 : Latvian Air Force (postwar)
 : Lithuanian Air Force (postwar)
 : Polish Air Force (postwar)
 : Royal Romanian Air Force (postwar)
 : Soviet Air Force (postwar) - purchased 50 D.VIIs from Fokker in 1920. 
 : Swedish Air Force (postwar) - operated a single D.VII from 1920.
 : Swiss Air Force
 : Ottoman Air Force
 : Ukrainian People's Republic Air Fleet (postwar)
 :
 United States Army Air Service (postwar)
 United States Marine Corps (postwar)

Survivors

Reproductions

Many modern D.VII reproductions have been built. Most flyable examples are powered by 7.2 litre (440 cu. in.) American Ranger, or 9.2 litre (560 cu. in.) displacement British Gipsy Queen inverted-six cylinder inline engines, both of which are substantially smaller in displacement than either the Mercedes or BMW engines that powered wartime D.VIIs. A few flying reproductions, such as the one at New York State's Old Rhinebeck Aerodrome, are equipped with original Mercedes D.IIIa engines.

Specifications (D.VII with Mercedes D.III engine)

See also

References

Bibliography

Further reading

External links

 Fokker D. VII – National Museum of the United States Air Force
 The Fokker D VII File website
 Original Fokker D VII, photos of the unrestored Fokker D VII at the Lac-Brome Museum in Knowlton/Lac-Brome, Quebec
 Fokker D.VII, Halberstadt CL.IV and Junkers D.I
 Old Rhinebeck Aerodrome's Fokker D.VII page (archived version from June 2014)
 www.all-aero.com Fokker D.VII
Vintage News Those Canadian Fokkers war Trophies 

D 07
1910s German fighter aircraft
1910s Austro-Hungarian fighter aircraft
Military aircraft of World War I
Aircraft of the Royal Netherlands East Indies Army
Biplanes
Single-engined tractor aircraft
Aircraft first flown in 1918